The following provides a full list of cameras and notable accessories manufactured under the Red Digital Cinema Company brand.

Cameras
Some models have different body variants: Aluminum Alloy, Forged or Woven Carbon Fiber and Magnesium and some have a custom-colored limited editions.

Red One

The Red One was Red Digital Cinema’s first production camera. Using a S35mm image plane, the Red One displays a natural depth of field from 2K to over 4K resolutions.

The first Red Ones were outfitted with the 12 megapixel Mysterium sensor, capable of capturing up to 120 frames per second at 2K resolution and 30 frames per second at 4K resolution. The only possible acquisition format is Redcode Raw.
The cameras were initially sold with a CF card slot that later could be replaced with a RedMag module.
The second generation, Red One Mysterium-X has a 14 megapixel Mysterium-X sensor. It captures up to 120 frames per second at 2K resolution and up to 30 frames per second at 4K resolution. With the upgraded sensor, the Red One Mysterium-X offers more dynamic range, higher sensitivity and enhanced color management tools than the Red One Mysterium.

DSMC
DSMC cameras are modular and can be customized in various configurations. Several lens mounts can be attached to the camera. The only possible acquisition format is Redcode Raw. Introduction of RedMag SSDs, later Red Mini-Mags.
Touchscreen introduction.

Scarlet M-X shoots regular speeds of up to 30fps at 4K and up to 120 fps at 2k. At 5K, it can't exceed 18fps.

DSMC2
DSMC2 cameras are modular and can be customised in various configurations. Several lens mounts can be attached to the camera. Differences to the former DSMC line are reduced size and weight, cable-less connections, as well as the addition of Apple ProRes and Avid DNx.

Ranger 
Ranger cameras are non-modular and come complete with a comprehensive I/O and power array. They are designed for demanding, higher budget studio work. The Ranger Monstro 8K VV was introduced as available for rental only, a first for Red.

DSMC3
DSMC3 cameras are modular and can be customised in various configurations. Several lens mounts can be attached to the camera, adapted from the RF mount. Differences to the former DSMC2 line are simplified compression options (LQ, MQ and HQ instead of ratios), more competitive pricing for Netflix shooters, and including more I/O on the body.

Panavision
Since 2016, Panavision has produced cameras based on Red's sensors.

Red has also made custom cameras for a few filmmakers, including Michael Bay's "Bayhem" Helium 8K and David Fincher’s Red Xenomorph.

Sensors
Up to this point, Red deployed a tick tock strategy. Red stated sensors are their most important asset.
The Dragon sensor received a score of 101 DxO Mark sensor rating. This marked the first time a digital cinema camera was tested alongside leading stills cameras. For economical reasons Scarlet-W and Dragon-X cameras have the same sensor as the 6K Dragon, but only 5K image area of it is utilized in Scarlet-W.  Red Raven has a "hard" 4.5K sensor.

Redcode 
Redcode Raw (.r3d) is a proprietary file format that employs wavelet compression to reduce the raw data coming off the sensor. This allows reduced file sizes while still keeping all advantages of a non-destructive raw workflow.
In the beginning Redcode was a JPEG2000 12bit linear file stream with PCM sound without encryption. Several third party applications were able to read and convert to other file format such as Cineform Raw. Redcode started as having two different options, named Redcode 28 and Redcode 36, later a 42 option was added.
With the introduction of the DSMC line these options were replaced by compression ratios.

HDRx
With the DSMC line HDRx was introduced as extension to Frame Summing asset, allowing the shooter to get up to 6 extra stops of dynamic range on a shot.

Media

Red CF
Proprietary CF cards

RedMag 1.8" SSD
Proprietary SSD

Red Mini-Mags
Proprietary interconnect to off the shelf mSATA SSD. Sold by Red in sizes of 120GB, 240GB, 480GB and 960GB.

Network
Capture over LAN

RCP Development Kit
Announced at NAB 2013 and launched in 2014, The RCP Development Kit is a SDK (software development kit) that allows programmers to create custom applications to control their camera via mobile device, computer, or micro-controller. The kit included the RCP Bridge, a wireless module that allows apps to communicate with the camera. The bridge supports a wireless communication range of approximately 50 feet.

Workflow

Redcine-X Pro 
Redcine-X Pro is a free-of-charge post-processing software collection developed by Red, built specifically for Red camera systems. It includes a coloring toolset, integrated timeline, and post effects software collection for both stills and motion. The post-production software allows for non-destructive manipulation of raw .R3D files. Redcine-X was the first workflow software developed solely by Red. Like Redcine, Red offered it as an end-to-end workflow solution for Red customers. It preceded the current Redcine-X Pro.

With Redcine-X Pro, users can mark frames while shooting and access those specific frames within their timeline. Additionally, there are features like A.D.D. (Advanced Dragon Debayer), a new algorithm for Dragon that analyzes every pixel, plus grading and raw adjustment options.

Previous Workflow Software

"Red Alert!" was the first form of workflow made available to Red owners/operators, though it was more of a diagnostic tool. It allowed Red One users to tweak debayer settings and render out to dpx/tiff/mov.

Redcine was the first end-to-end workflow for Red users. A third-party company developed the software, and Red provided the SDK.

Hardware accelerators

Red Rocket 

Red Rocket is an internal PCI Express card that is capable of 4K, 2K, or 1080p real-time debayering and video playback of R3D files coming from Mysterium and Mysterium-X sensors. It can be used to accelerate video editing in compatible Non-linear editing systems, outputting the image via HD-SDI to a user-supplied monitor. A component of the Red Rocket allows users to convert the HD-SDI signal to four HDMI outputs.

Red Rocket-X 

Red Rocket-X is an internal PCI Express card optimized for the 6K Dragon sensor and is designed to accelerate the processing of R3D workflow, regardless of resolution. Compared to Red Rocket, Red Rocket-X processes and transcodes files up to five times faster.

Debayering subpar asset.

Third party workflow systems

Red offers the Red Apple Workflow Installer, which allows R3D RAW settings within Final Cut Pro X. Other applications include support for QuickTime to use .R3D files, and plugins for Adobe Photoshop, Adobe Premiere Pro, Avid Media Composer, Final Cut Pro X, and Sony Vegas Pro.

Notable accessories

3-Axis lens control system
The Red 3-Axis lens control system is a turn-key wireless lens control kit for driving focus, iris and zoom. Included is the T.H.C. (Tactical Hand Controller), a wireless remote that allows the operator to adjust lens settings from a distance.

References

Red digital cinema
Red Digital Cinema